Ray Martin (born 1936) is an American professional pool player, nicknamed "Cool Cat". He acquired his nickname when he calmly won a world title in 1971 in California when during the event an earthquake was in progress.

Professional career

He held the World Champion title in straight pool in 1971, 1974 and 1978.

In 1994, Martin was inducted into the Billiard Congress of America's Hall of Fame.

He is a winner of win three World Straight Pool Championship titles. He has also won several nine-ball tournaments, including the 1980 Lake Tahoe Invitational, the 1981 King of the Hill Pool Championship, and the 1983 Music City Open.  He finished 4th and 5th, respectively in the 1992 and 1993 BCA US Opens. From 1989 to 1991 he served as a contributing editor and wrote the Nine-Ball Safeties column for The Snap Magazine.

Titles
 1968 New Jersey State 14.1 Tournament
 1970 New York State 14.1 Tournament
 1971 BCA World Straight Pool Championship
 1971 National Billiard Player of the Year
 1972 New Jersey State 14.1 Tournament
 1974 BCA World Straight Pool Championship
 1978 Connecticut State 14.1 Tournament
 1978 PPPA World Straight Pool Championship
 1980 Atlantic City Invitational 14.1
 1980 Lake Tahoe Invitational All-Around
 1981 King of the Hill Pool Championship
 1983 Music City Open 9-Ball
 1983 Florida 9-Ball Championship 
 1992 Florida International 9-Ball Classic
 1993 Florida Open 9-Ball 
 1994 Palm Harbour Open 9-Ball
 1994 Billiard Congress of America Hall of Fame

Books
The 99 Critical Shots in Pool (1977). Co-authored with Rosser Reeves

References

American pool players
Living people
1936 births
Date of birth missing (living people)
Place of birth missing (living people)